Dave Benz is an American broadcaster who formerly served as the television play-by-play announcer for the Minnesota Timberwolves of the National Basketball Association (NBA).

Broadcasting career

Comcast SportsNet
Benz hosted several programs for the San Francisco 49ers, such as 49ers Postgame Live, 49ers Central, and 49ers Press Conference. He hosted pregame/postgame shows for the Golden State Warriors, Oakland Athletics, and the San Jose Sharks and was an anchor for SportsNet Central. He also did play-by-play for college basketball, reported for Sportsnet Reporters, and was the voice of the San Jose SaberCats of the Arena Football League.

KNBR-AM
He has also worked for KNBR-AM as a fill-in host for The Gary Radnich Show, The Damon Bruce Show, and Sportsphone 680.

WTTG-TV
Benz was also employed by WTTG-TV as a sports anchor/reporter and hosted pregame/halftime/postgame shows for the Washington Redskins.

The Mountain
Benz also called college basketball games for the MountainWest Sports Network.

KLZ-560 AM
Dave also was a talk show host for KLZ-560 AM and was the host of a four-hour talk show host, Sportstown.

Fox Sports/Fox Sports Net/Bally Sports
While working for the Fox Sports family, hosted several shows for Fox Sports Rocky Mountain such as AFL Weekly, Broncos Preview, Rockies All Access, Rockies Roundup, Crush Weekly, Insider Edition, and The Buffalo Stampede. He did play-by-play for Colorado Rockies spring training, hosted pregame/postgame shows for various sports such as college football and basketball, play-by-play commentator for the Colorado Crush, Colorado State Tigers men's basketball, and Colorado Buffalos men's and women's basketball and Denver Pioneers men's basketball, sideline reporting for the Colorado Crush and the Colorado Buffalos; football and men's basketball. He also did some sideline reporting for the Fox NFL Sunday. He was the host of Mavericks Live, a pregame/postgame show host for the Dallas Mavericks and performed the same role for the San Antonio Spurs. He also hosted Florida Sports Report and Southwest Sports Report.

Other work
He worked as sports anchor and sports reporter at WTTV-TV and WXIN-TV as well as a sports director for WUTR-TV. He was the pregame/postgame host for the Colorado Rockies Radio Network and hosted shows Softball 360, SledHead 24/7, and Autoweek. He was also the pregame/halftime/postgame host for the Green Bay Packers Radio Network. His other play-by-play experiences came from the Green Bay Bombers and the Wisconsin Blast. The Minnesota Timberwolves hired Benz to replace Tom Hanneman as the voice of the Timberwolves.

References
 http://www.foxsportsnorth.com/10/1/12/Benz-I-love-sports-I-live-sport/landing_timberwolves.html?blockID=79
 http://minnesota.cbslocal.com/2012/10/1/dave-benz-names-wolves-tv-play-by-play-announcer
 https://archive.today/20130215190621/http://www.csnbayarea.com/sportsnetBayArea/search/v/64581283/so-long-to-csn-anchor-dave-benz.htm

Television anchors from Washington, D.C.
Television anchors from Indianapolis
Colorado Rockies announcers
Golden State Warriors announcers
San Jose Sharks announcers
Oakland Athletics announcers
Green Bay Packers announcers
Living people
American television sports announcers
American television sports anchors
American radio sports announcers
American talk radio hosts
National Basketball Association broadcasters
Major League Baseball broadcasters
Arena football announcers
Women's college basketball announcers in the United States
National Hockey League broadcasters
National Football League announcers
College basketball announcers in the United States
Minnesota Timberwolves announcers
College football announcers
Olympic Games broadcasters
Year of birth missing (living people)